Boiga ochracea, commonly called the tawny cat snake, is a species of rear-fanged snake in the family Colubridae. The species is endemic to South Asia.

Geographic range
B. ochracea is found in the Andaman Islands, Bangladesh, Bhutan, India (Changlang District), Myanmar, and Nepal. It is also found in China.

Subspecies
Three subspecies are recognized as being valid, including the nominotypical subspecies.
Boiga ochracea ochracea 
Boiga ochracea stoliczkae 
Boiga ochracea walli 

Nota bene: A trinomial authority in parentheses indicates that the subspecies was originally described in a genus other than Boiga.

Reproduction
B. ochracea is oviparous.

Etymology
The subspecific names, stoliczkae and walli, are in honor of Moravian herpetologist Ferdinand Stoliczka and British herpetologist Frank Wall, respectively.

References

Further reading
Boulenger GA (1890). The Fauna of British India, Including Ceylon and Burma. Reptilia and Batrachia. London: Secretary of State for India in Council. (Taylor & Francis, printers). xviii + 541 pp. (Dipsas hexagonotus, p. 361).
Boulenger GA (1896). Catalogue of the Snakes in the British Museum (Natural History). Volume III., Containing the Colubridæ (Opisthoglyphæ and Proteroglyphæ) ... London: Trustees of the British Museum (Natural History). (Taylor and Francis, printers). xiv + 727 pp. + Plates I-XXV. (Dipsadomorphus hexagonotus, pp. 65–66).
Das I (2002). A Photographic Guide to Snakes and other Reptiles of India. Sanibel Island, Florida: Ralph Curtis Books. 144 pp. . (Boiga ochracea, p. 25).
Günther A (1868). "Sixth Account of new Species of Snakes in the Collection of the British Museum". Annals and Magazine of Natural History, Fourth Series 1: 413-429. (Dipsas ochraceus, p. 425).
Smith MA (1943). The Fauna of British India, Ceylon and Burma, Including the Whole of the Indo-Chinese Sub-region. Reptilia and Amphibia. Vol. III.—Serpentes. London: Secretary of State for India. (Taylor and Francis, printers). xii + 583 pp. (Boiga ochracea, pp. 348–349).
Theobald W (1868) ("1870" on title page). "Catalogue of the Reptiles of British Birma [sic], embracing the Provinces of Pegu, Martaban, and Tenasserim; with descriptions of new or little-known species". Journal of the Linnean Society, Zoology 10: 4-67. (Dipsas ochracea, new species, pp. 53–54). (in English and Latin).
Tillack, Frank (1999) "Boiga ochracea stoliczkae (Wall)". Sauria 21 (2): 2.
Wall F (1909). "Remarks on some forms of Dipsadomorphus ". Records of the Indian Museum 3: 151-155.

ochracea
Reptiles described in 1868